Statistics of USL D3 Pro League in season 2000.

League standings
                            GP   W   L   D   GF  GA  BP Pts
     Northern Division
 New Jersey Stallions        18  14   3   1   43  21   7  64
 South Jersey Barons         18  12   6   0   46  33   9  57
 New Hampshire Phantoms      18  10   6   2   30  20   5  47
 Reading Rage                18   9   9   0   28  29   4  40
 Western Mass Pioneers       18   8   8   2   30  28   4  38
 Cape Cod Crusaders          18   7   6   5   29  23   4  37
 Delaware Wizards            18   5  12   1   28  46   5  26
 Rhode Island Stingrays      18   5  11   2   22  41   2  24

     Southern Division
 Texas Rattlers              18  14   4   0   43  29   8  64
 Wilmington Hammerheads      18  13   4   1   47  19   7  60
 Charlotte Eagles            18  11   4   3   47  22   7  54
 Carolina Dynamo             18   9   8   1   38  31   5  42
 Houston Hurricanes          18   8   9   1   42  41   9  42
 Roanoke Wrath               18   6  11   1   24  45   4  29
 Northern Virginia Royals    18   6  12   0   30  53   4  28
 Austin Lone Stars           18   2  15   1   18  45   2  11

     Western Division
 Chico Rooks                 18  12   6   0   39  28   8  56
 Utah Blitzz                 18  11   4   3   34  20   7  54
 Tucson Fireballs            18  11   5   2   36  27   7  53
 Stanislaus United Cruisers  18   7  10   1   35  32   5  34
 Riverside County Elite      18   7  10   1   35  22   5  34
 Arizona Sahuaros            18   5  12   1   46  53   7  28

 Conference Quarterfinals: Western Massachusetts defeated South Jersey 3-2(OT)
                          Reading defeated New Hampshire 3–2.
                          Carolina defeated Texas 4–2.
                          Charlotte defeated Wilmington 3–1.
                          Chico defeated Stanislaus County 3–2.
                          Utah defeated Tulsa 1–0.
 Conference Semifinals:    Utah defeated Chico 1-0 (OT)
                          Western Massachusetts defeated Reading 4–0.
                          Charlotte defeated Carolina 4–1.
 Conference Finals:        Charlotte defeated Utah 4–2.
                          New Jersey defeated Western Massachusetts 1–0.
 CHAMPIONSHIP:             Charlotte defeated New Jersey 5–0.

References

2000
3